The Eastern Zone was one of the three regional zones of the 1961 Davis Cup.

7 teams entered the Eastern Zone, with the winner going on to compete in the Inter-Zonal Zone against the winners of the America Zone and Europe Zone. India defeated Japan in the final and progressed to the Inter-Zonal Zone.

Draw

Quarterfinals

Ceylon vs. Thailand

Indonesia vs. India

Semifinals

Japan vs. Philippines

India vs. Thailand

Final

India vs. Japan

References

External links
Davis Cup official website

Davis Cup Asia/Oceania Zone
Eastern Zone
Davis Cup